Moudi bint Khalid Al Saud is a member of the House of Saud, the Saudi royal family. She was among the first female members of the Consultative Assembly of Saudi Arabia who served in the post between January 2013 and December 2016.

Early life and education
Princess Moudi is the daughter of King Khalid and Sita bint Fahd Al Damir. She received basic education in Riyadh and studied French.

Career
Moudi bint Khalid is the general secretary the King Khalid Foundation and the chair of its investment committee. She is also the general secretary of the Al Nahda Foundation of Riyadh. The foundation was awarded the first Chaillot prize for human rights organisations in the Persian Gulf region in 2009. She is a board member of the Saut, an agency of the down syndrome foundation in Saudi Arabia. In 2011 she began to provide fellowships under the Legatum Center to Saudi Arabian students attending Massachusetts Institute of Technology. She is one of the board members of Art of Heritage Organization.

In January 2013 Princess Moudi was elected to the Consultative Assembly, being one of the first 30 Saudi Arabian women appointed to the assembly. She was one of the two royal women appointed to the Assembly along with Sara bint Faisal, daughter of King Faisal. Tenure of both royal women ended in December 2016 when King Salman appointed new members to the Assembly.

Personal life
Princess Moudi married Abdul Rahman bin Faisal, son of King Faisal. Prince Abdul Rahman was a military officer in the Saudi Army. He died at age 73 in March 2014.

They had three children, two daughters, Sara and Al Bandari, and a son, Saud. Al Bandari bint Abdul Rahman who was the head of King Khalid Foundation and several other non-governmental organizations died in March 2019.

References

Moudi
Moudi
Moudi
Moudi
Living people
Moudi
Moudi
Moudi
Moudi
Year of birth missing (living people)